Rollins Pass, elevation , is a mountain pass and active archaeological site in the Southern Rocky Mountains of north-central Colorado in the United States. The pass is located on and traverses the Continental Divide of the Americas at the crest of the Front Range southwest of Boulder and is located approximately five miles east and opposite the resort in Winter Park—in the general area between Winter Park and Rollinsville. Rollins Pass is at the boundaries of Boulder, Gilpin, and Grand counties. Over the past 10,000 years, the pass provided a route over the Continental Divide between the Atlantic Ocean watershed of South Boulder Creek (in the basin of the South Platte River) with the Pacific Ocean watershed of the Fraser River, a tributary of the Colorado River.

The abandoned rail route over Rollins Pass was nominated for and accepted into the National Register of Historic Places in 1980 because of significant events and engineering feats accomplished by railroading efforts in the early 20th century. In 1997, additional areas on the pass were added to the National Register of Historic Places to include achievements made by John Q.A. Rollins and his toll wagon road that traversed the pass.

In 2012, Rollins Pass was listed as one of the most endangered sites in Colorado.

Naming
Rollins Pass is the sole, official name recognized by both the United States Geological Survey and the United States Board on Geographic Names (BGN); a decision card was issued on Wednesday, December 7, 1904. The pass was first known as Boulder Pass—one of two variant names accepted by the BGN—the other being Rogers Pass. The pass was also known infrequently as Rollinsville Pass.

In Grand County, Rollins Pass is sometimes given the sobriquet of Corona Pass, named for the apex station at the summit, Corona. This nomenclature dispute provoked the ire of former railroaders; in fact, Frederick Bauer remarked, "[Rollins Pass is] incorrectly called Corona Pass by neophytes and some locals." It is inconsistent, as well as atypical, to refer to mountain passes by the names of their apex stations. Fremont Pass, for example, is not named Climax Pass; nor is La Veta Pass referred to as Fir Pass.

Elevation
The elevation of '11,660 feet' commonly attributed to Rollins Pass (note the McClure sketch later in this article) "reflects what might have been an original survey value obtained during either the late wagon road era or early railroad construction. ... The actual benchmarked survey elevation value of the summit of Rollins Pass is 11,671 feet (NGVD29), obtained during a 1952 second-order level line run from State Bridge to Denver by the US Coast and Geodetic Survey (predecessor to the National Geodetic Survey). When adjusted to NAVD88, the elevation is, without doubt, 11,676.79 feet."

Description
Rollins Pass has been in continuous use for millennia: first as a sprawling and internationally significant game drive complex that was hand-constructed and used by Paleoindians more than 10,000 years ago through the mid-19th century; followed by nearly two decades as a wagon road from 1862–1880; as a rail route (under survey, construction, and later operational) from 1880 to 1928; as a primitive automobile road from 1936 to 1956; and since September 1, 1956 as a seasonal, unpaved motor vehicle road.

The pass is traversed by Paleoindians and Native American game drive complexes, hiking trails, including the Continental Divide Trail; an airway radial (V8), a 10" Xcel Energy high-pressure natural gas pipeline, and two roads:

 The first dirt road is the Rollinsville and Middle Park Wagon Road, created in the early 1860s and this route predates the rail line. This road employed much of what would later become Rollins Pass, particularly above timberline. This original wagon route, now called the Boulder Wagon Road, took a steep counterclockwise route up Guinn Mountain encircling Yankee Doodle Lake before continuing to head west/northwest to proceed over the summit and down into the Middle Park valley near present-day Winter Park and Fraser, Colorado.
 The second dirt road is mostly the former roadbed of the Denver, Northwestern, and Pacific Railway, that later became the Denver and Salt Lake Railway. This high-altitude railroad grade was part of the Moffat Road and this route was replaced (and later abandoned) by the opening of the Moffat Tunnel in 1928; the rails and ties were removed from Rollins Pass in 1936; however, some rail segments as well as ties, made of pine, oak, and walnut, can still be seen, along with planking used for snowsheds.

Geology
The Front Range was created by the Laramide Orogeny, the last of three major mountain-building events, which occurred between 70 and 40 million years ago. Tectonic activity during the Cenozoic Era changed the Ancestral Rocky Mountains via block uplift, eventually forming the Rocky Mountains as they exist today. The geologic make-up of Rollins Pass and the surrounding areas were also affected by deformation and erosion during the Cenozoic Era. Many sedimentary rocks from the Paleozoic and Mesozoic eras exist in the basins surrounding the pass.

History

Rollins Pass as a prehistoric Paleoindian & Native American hunting complex
Paleoindians and early Native Americans were the first to utilize Rollins Pass as a natural, low crossing over the Continental Divide for the purposes of communal hunting of large game, including bighorn sheep and elk. There are more than 96 documented game drives, including the Olson game drive, found largely above timberline and near the summits of multiple mountain ridges. Handmade rock walls drove prey toward hunters waiting in blinds. These unique high-altitude constructs were built, refined, and continually used over millennia.  The game drives built on—and over—Rollins Pass have international significance.

The Olson game drive
The Olson site (5BL147) is a multi-component rock walled game drive and is but one part of a much larger game drive complex located on Rollins Pass. Byron Olson and James Benedict conducted work at the site in the late-1960s. Present-day archaeology teams built on Olson and Benedict's work to expand the overview of the site using modern techniques. As of 2013, at least 45 blinds as well as 1,307 meters of rock walls are present across the Olson site; the purposes of which were to funnel game upslope to waiting hunters. Both radiocarbon and lichenometric dating suggest occupation by Native Americans spanning the last 3,200 years, with diagnostic tools suggesting even older use of the site, dating back to more than 10,000 years ago.

Other significant game drives
Game drives at other locations on Rollins Pass yield hundreds of additional blinds and miles of rock walls.

Rollins Pass as a late-prehistoric and historic Native American route
Rollins Pass has a documented history as a migratory route, hunting trail, and battlefield among the late prehistoric and contact-period Indians of Colorado.

Rollins Pass as an historic wagon road
The first recorded use of the pass (then known as Boulder Pass or Rollinsville Pass) by a wagon train was in 1862, nearly 14 years before Colorado became a state. Directions for wagons traveling from Rollinsville to Winter Park were published in newspapers. John Quincy Adams Rollins, a Colorado pioneer from a family of pioneers, constructed a toll wagon road over the pass in the 1873, providing a route between the Colorado Front Range and Middle Park; subsequently, Rollins Pass was named after John Q.A. Rollins.

John Quincy Adams Rollins
John Q.A. Rollins was born on Sunday, June 16, 1816 in Gilmanton, New Hampshire and was the son of a New England minister. Rollins is described as being a strong man and an extensive character, popular with almost everybody whom he did not owe and his one predominating fault was his failure to pay his debts. Newspapers cited that he was so careless about his credit that he could not keep track of all his creditors, and in turn, they had trouble keeping track of him. Rollins died on Wednesday, June 20, 1894 and is buried in Colorado's oldest operating cemetery, Riverside, in block 5, lot 12. His simple tombstone reads, "John Q.A. Rollins | Colorado Pioneer of Rollinsville and Rollins Pass." Colonel Rollins' newspaper obituary mentions, "No man in Northern Colorado was better known nor counted more warm friends than John Q.A. Rollins."

Middle Park and South Boulder Wagon Road Company

John Rollins capitalized on this and received approval for his toll wagon road on Tuesday, February 6, 1866. The Council and House of Representatives of Colorado Territory passed an act signed by the governor approving the wagon road as the "Middle Park and South Boulder Wagon Road Company." Records reflect the incorporators as "John Q.A. Rollins, Perley Dodge, Frederic C. Weir." Yet, the "Rollins road" through Boulder Pass was not completed until the first half of August 1873. While the newspaper articles cited "wagons can now be taken over this route without the slightest trouble," other articles countered, "the trail ... is splendid for horses but fearful for wagons" and "the rocks, mud-holes, bogs, creeks, boulders and sidling ledges of that road, can only be appreciated by being seen, the only wonder is that a wagon can be taken over at all." Other articles were a bit more grim, referring to the wagon road as a "little more than the rocky ridge of a precipice along which lurked death and disaster." Newspaper records reflect on Friday, June 12, 1874, James Harvey Crawford along with his wife, Margaret Emerine Bourn Crawford, made pioneer history as the first (nonindigenous) couple to cross Rollins Pass by wagons, and Mrs. Crawford is credited as the first woman to cross the pass. That day held many challenges, including a two-hour blizzard, "which was of terrific violence" and she remarked in a newspaper article, "the bumping was so hard I thought I was nearly dead." As there was no formal road constructed from "Yankee Doodle Camp on up, only an Indian trail, she and the children had been left behind while her husband took the wagon pulled by a pair of mules, a team of horses and a yoke of oxen on up and camped. Then he came back for her with the team and the running gear only of the wagon, and she had to hold the children on someway, despite the dreadful bumping" with the "wagon almost standing on end."

The pass was used heavily in the latter half of the 19th century by settlers and at one time as many as 12,000 cattle at a time were driven over the pass. The wagon road had one tollgate and the following rate structure: "For each vehicle drawn by two animals, two dollars and fifty cents; for each additional two animals, twenty-five cents; each vehicle drawn by one animal, one dollar and fifty cents; horse and rider and pack animals, twenty-five cents; loose stock, five cents per head ... horse with rider, or pack animal with pack, ten cents." The cost for nonpayment of a toll was the same as causing intentional damage to the road: $25.

According to the manuscript of Martin Parsons, "Twistin Dogies Tails Over Rollins Pass", each summer, Mr. Rollins would "build a cribbing of logs ... and would fill the center with rocks and earth, which helped reduce the grade between the hills." The original log cribbing can be seen today on the narrow ridge of Guinn Mountain, north of Yankee Doodle Lake. Rollins also built The Junction House, "a large, two-story hewd-log structure" as a hotel, "at the point of intersection of the Berthoud and Rollins roads."

The road began to fall out of use and into disrepair in 1880, approximately one year before early railroading attempts over the pass begun.

Mining efforts on Guinn Mountain at Yankee Doodle Lake
Guinn Mountain, encircling Yankee Doodle Lake, was used for mining from the early 1870s through the establishment of the railroad in 1904.

This area held at least "four silver lodes" or "five patented lode claims, one patented placer claim, several prospect pits and the dump of one caved adit." This tunnel exposed a "five-foot vein of ore varying in values from $16 to $25 per ton."

It was concluded that the "Guinn Mountain area has little or no economic potential," despite listings of important mineral strikes in period newspapers. Further, "ten samples collected in the area contained only negligible amounts of any metal. Samples from the Avalon placer claim, located on the South Fork [of] Middle Boulder Creek north of Guinn Mountain, and from the creek bottom were collected and panned; no gold was found." Despite this record, gold claims were nevertheless worked nearby with no published record of success.

Rollins Pass as an historic railroad route

Early railroad endeavors
There were multiple prior efforts to build a railroad over Rollins Pass in the 19th century and all attempts were met with impassable engineering challenges, financing issues, or both: GHS, Jefferson, & Boulder County Railroad and Wagon Road (A.N. Rogers' line) in 1867; U.P. in 1866; Kansas Pacific in 1869; Colorado Railroad (B. & M. subsidiary) in 1884—two tunnels located; Denver, Utah & Pacific in 1881 (construction started and tunnel located). The remains of the latter tunneling attempt can still be seen on the northern slope of the rock wall at Yankee Doodle Lake and the detritus from the attempted excavation of the tunnel was placed at the northernmost part of the lake where pulverized granite tailings can be seen rising out of the water. These tailings were definitively from the 1880s tunneling efforts as they are not visible in the early stereoscopic images from the wagon road era of Yankee Doodle Lake; further, the attempted tunnel was not part of the later rail line that ultimately summited Rollins Pass.

The Moffat Road over Rollins Pass
In the early 20th century, David Moffat, a Denver banker, established the Denver, Northwestern and Pacific Railway with the intention of building a railroad from Denver toward Salt Lake City, Utah by way of a tunnel under the Continental Divide. Surveys began in April 1902 and construction was started in January 1903, beginning on the east side of Rollins Pass. However, the railway only reached Craig, Colorado. This entire line from Denver to Craig was known as the Moffat Road.

The line included a  stretch over the top of the Continental Divide, at Rollins Pass, with a two to four percent grade and switchbacks along many sections; the result was one of the highest adhesion (non-cog) standard-gauge railroads ever constructed in North America. This corridor over Rollins Pass was always intended to be temporary until what would later become the Moffat Tunnel was constructed and opened; therefore this overmountain route was constructed with more cost-effective materials: using wooden trestles (made of all Oregon fir) instead of iron bridges or high fills and wyes instead of turntables. Construction of this route was exceptionally dangerous and deadly: in a single day, 60 Swedish workers were killed when a powder charge exploded prematurely during the construction of Needle's Eye Tunnel.

Along this route were three tunnels: Tunnel #31 (the tunnel at Ladora), Tunnel #32 (Needle's Eye Tunnel), and Tunnel #33 (the Loop Tunnel at Riflesight Notch). All three tunnels today are either completely caved in or have had multiple partial cave-ins. Other notable landmarks on the route included the Riflesight Notch Loop, located at Spruce Mountain: a  spiral or loop where trains crossed over a trestle, made a ~90 degree gradual turn to descend , and passed through Tunnel #33 underneath the trestle.

A rail station, Corona, was established at the summit of the pass, with a red brick and green roofed dining hall, weather station, power station, and lodging. In summers, the train ride from Denver to Corona was advertised as a trip, "from sultry heat to Colorado's north pole;" tourists could stand in snowdrifts in the middle of July or August. Tours launched from the Moffat Depot, a small building constructed in the Georgian Revival style, featuring two-story tall windows, intricate exterior brickwork, and roofline pommels. This building, located several city blocks northwest from Denver Union Station, was added to the National Register of Historic Places in 1976, and lay dormant for many decades after it was shuttered in 1947; in 2015, it was made the focal point of a senior living community center, after it was meticulously restored.

Weather and operational difficulties
Despite the fact that the line was enclosed in almost continuous snowsheds (wooden tunnels) near the summit of the pass, trains were often stranded for several days (and in some cases up to 30–60 days) during heavy snowstorms because snow could fall or be blown through the wood planking of the sheds. Delays affected the timeliness of both newspaper and postal mail deliveries. Coal smoke and toxic gasses collected in the snowsheds causing temporary blindness, loss of consciousness, and sometimes death. Workers on the Moffat Road had an adage: "There's winter and then there's August", reflecting the fact that in the high mountains of Colorado, snow will often cover the area for more than six months and very cold and snowy weather may occur nearly year-round. It was these heavy snowstorms that led to the financial demise of the Moffat Road and served as the incentive for construction of a permanent railroad tunnel through the Rocky Mountains and into Middle Park.

Following scuba dives, no evidence exists that locomotive, rotary, or wreck debris rests at the bottom of Yankee Doodle Lake or Jenny Lake. However, many derailments, wrecks of Mallet locomotives, accidents resulting in injury and/or death, and/or the loss of portions of rail manifests occurred on both sides of the pass:

Despite the challenges documented above, by 1918, it was reported that 45 or 46 engines were part of the motive power of the railroad along with 3 rotary snowplows.

The Moffat Tunnel

Several locations for the Moffat Tunnel were scouted prior to the selection of the present-day location; one possible location was identified at high altitude between Yankee Doodle Lake and the Forest Lakes.

Plans to build a longer tunnel at a lower elevation were better planned and financed; the single-track Moffat Tunnel opened just south of Rollins Pass on Sunday, February 26, 1928. The Moffat Tunnel eliminated 10,800 degrees of curvature along the Rollins Pass route; the tunnel resulted in considerable time savings as well as money that was used for snow removal atop Rollins Pass. After the first year of operations, an annual report to stockholders showed "marked savings in operating costs" by 24.86%. Savings were seen in other areas, including in fuel reductions ($89,074.45 savings; $1.3 million in 2018 when adjusted for inflation), engine servicing ($156,188.89 savings); whereas gross tons per train hour increased by 34.84%.

After the Moffat Tunnel opened, the tracks over Rollins Pass remained in place and were maintained at least as late as July 1929 as an emergency route. It took until Tuesday, July 30, 1929 for the tunnel to be cleared of debris. Permission to dismantle the rails on Rollins Pass was granted by the Interstate Commerce Commission on Saturday, May 18, 1935 and the rails were removed the following summer: the west side was cleared by Tuesday, August 11, 1936, and the east side 14 days later; contractors toiled non-stop, including overnight to remove both the rails and ties. A wye on the passing siding at the East Portal of the Moffat Tunnel is currently utilized for short-turning some modern services and marks the spot where the Rollins Pass line, if it still existed, would have merged into the modern route.

The route through the Moffat Tunnel became part of the mainline across Colorado for the Denver and Salt Lake Railroad, later the Denver and Rio Grande Railroad, and now the Union Pacific Railroad. The Moffat Tunnel continues to be used for both the Amtrak's California Zephyr that provides service between Chicago, Illinois and Emeryville, California as well as for the winter and sometimes summer Ski Train that operated between Denver and Winter Park from 1940 to 2009; in March 2015 and from 2017–present, the service was rebranded the Winter Park Express.

The original 1922 law that authorized the construction of the Moffat Tunnel specified that it should also be used for automobile traffic, with automobiles being placed on a ferry of flatbed railcars. To date, this has not happened.

The pioneer bore used to originally construct the Moffat Tunnel was later converted into the Moffat Water Tunnel by Denver Water.

Rollins Pass as an air route and navigational waypoint
In the era of powered flight, Rollins Pass provides an attractive way to cross the Continental Divide between west and east at a relatively low point for aircraft. Not only does the enroute airway radial, Victor Eight, cross the pass; but also a rotating airway beacon was established in the mid-to-late 1940s and first appeared on aeronautical sectional charts in March 1948 as a star, indicating a beacon. The beacon and its supporting infrastructure have since been removed due to the introduction of the Low-Frequency Radio Range systems to replace visual navigational aids. The rough road that was once used to service and reach Beacon Peak at the Continental Divide, branches off of the Rollins Pass road, and is closed to all forms of motorized traffic per the current Motor Vehicle Use Maps.

Rollins Pass as an historic automobile road
Plans to convert Rollins Pass into an historic automobile road were first published in November 1949. Several years later, on Saturday, September 1, 1956, Colorado lieutenant governor, Steve McNichols, opened Rollins Pass as a non-vital and seasonal recreational road. Each summer, from 1956–1979, Rollins Pass served as a complete road over the mountain pass for automobiles until a substantial rock fall in Needle's Eye Tunnel in 1979 closed the path over the pass. In 1989, after several engineering studies and structural strengthening of Needle's Eye Tunnel were accomplished, the complete road was re-opened only to close permanently in 1990, due to a rockfall injuring a sightseer. For the past  years—since July 1990—no motorized route connects across the Continental Divide, effectively making each side a dead-end uphill route that must be traveled again, downhill, to leave the pass.

Rollins Pass as a natural gas pipeline route
In 1969, a natural gas pipeline was placed on Rollins Pass. In the mid-1990s, Rollins Pass was closed for the installation of a  diameter Xcel Energy high-pressure natural gas pipeline. The pipeline, not always under marker, still is in existence and uses the low pass to reach the Front Range by loosely following County Road 8 in Fraser, utilizing much of Ranch Creek towards the Middle Fork of Ranch Creek below Mount Epworth, climbing the pass near Ptarmigan Point, and following much of the old railbed past Corona at the summit of Rollins Pass. The pipeline continues across the railbed towards and under the twin trestles, down the old wagon route on the spine of Guinn Mountain, and then towards Eldora. The pipeline undergoes internal inspections "at least" every seven years with the deployment of a smart pig inside the pipeline.

Artifacts and features

Preservation of both prehistoric and historic records
A majority of Rollins Pass is located within the boundaries of two national forests—Roosevelt National Forest and Arapaho National Forest—and as such, is federal land. The Archaeological Resources Protection Act along with the Antiquities Act, among other federal and cultural laws, recognizes the nonrenewable and vulnerable nature of cultural resources and these laws protect and make it illegal to collect artifacts, including but not limited to: arrowheads, horseshoes, buttons, cans, glass or ceramic bottles, dishware and utensils, coal, railroad spikes, snowshed wood, railroad ties, and telegraph poles from Rollins Pass. All artifacts—from the prehistoric to the historic—on the pass are objects of antiquity and are being studied and documented by universities and government agencies. The material record of Rollins Pass is illegally carried away each year—some by poachers—others in the backpacks of well-intentioned visitors who want a souvenir; but once artifacts are removed, a place can never again reveal the mysteries of the past. Each artifact has important scientific and cultural value and theft harms the historical record. Visitors are encouraged to preserve the area for future generations by leaving items in place and sharing photographs and GPS coordinates (if available) with researchers dedicated to telling the story of Rollins Pass and an internet resource has been set up to aid with this project.

Enforcement
County sheriffs as well as United States Forest Service Law Enforcement personnel and staff routinely patrol and enforce natural and cultural resources on Rollins Pass as well as in other areas within the National Forest System.

Artifacts affecting the road prism
On both sides of Rollins Pass, the road prism contains both prehistoric and historic artifacts buried under the surface. Any improvements to the rough road through regrading, including paving, would first require extensive sectional archaeological excavations by the United States Forest Service. In several places, on or just under the surface, historical artifacts are covered with geotextile stabilization fabrics having characteristics that match the soil and permeability of the existing roadbed.

Drystacks
There are several drystack retaining walls on both sides of the pass, built without mortar, helping ensure they retain soil but not water.

Ghost towns, settlements, and gravesites
There are several ghost towns on or near Rollins Pass, the most notable being Arrow, Corona, Ladora, the East Portal construction camp, Mammoth, and Tolland. There are also at least a half-dozen other established settlements, dating back to both the wagon road and railroad eras, scattered across Rollins Pass.

There are also several historic gravesites across Rollins Pass. One granite headstone at Arrow reads, "R.M. Smith | June 28, 1842 | Nov. 12, 1909." One marker near the Eldora Ski Area states that it holds two members of John C. Frémont's third expedition in 1845–1846, although this is disputed.

Environment

Leave No Trace
Rollins Pass has unique floral, faunal, and riparian zones that spread across multiple Colorado counties; to best preserve the native environment of Rollins Pass, leave no trace and trail ethics apply to all visitors. Trundling is discouraged for safety and environmental concerns as well as to preserve artifacts.

Flora
Rollins Pass consists of several distinct floral environments including lodgepole pine and quaking aspen at lower elevations, and krummholz at tree line. Above tree line, the landscape consists largely of small perennial wildflowers, cryptobiotic soils, and alpine tundra. The latter being extremely fragile and if damaged, can take 100–500 years to recover. Leaving the trail can cause erosion, land degradation, possible species extinction, and habitat destruction and it is for these reasons vehicles, including off-road vehicles, are not allowed to leave the established road. There are at least two marked revegetation areas on Rollins Pass: one at Yankee Doodle Lake; the other at the summit leading to the historic dining hall foundation.

Pine beetle epidemic
The mountain pine beetle epidemic, beginning in 1996 and continuing through present day, affects many forested areas in Colorado, including those on Rollins Pass. One out of every 14 trees in Colorado is dead. Trees affected by the beetles contain 10 times less water than a healthy tree and crown fires can quickly spread.

Fauna
The top predator in the area are black bears (Ursus americanus), generally below timberline; however, they occasionally venture above the krummholz. The bears prey on bighorn sheep (Ovis canadensis) and mountain goats (Oreamnos americanus), as well as yellow-bellied marmot (Marmota flaviventris) in the region. Above timberline, pikas (Ochotona princeps) are common. At or below timberline, both elk (Cervus canadensis) and mule deer (Odocoileus hemionus) are common. The presence of migratory bighorn sheep and other large game is the reason why Native Americans constructed sprawling yet intricate game drive complexes on Rollins Pass.

The porcupine can be seen at all elevations on Rollins Pass, including at (and above) the summit. The porcupine begins its rounds at sunset, as it is nocturnal; this member of the rodent family also has the ability to adroitly climb trees.

Among birds, the white-tailed ptarmigan (Lagopus leucurus) are present on Rollins Pass, especially above treeline. Their seasonal camouflage is effective in the summer against the exposed blocks of granite as well as against snow in the winter, rendering them virtually undetectable. Brown-capped rosy finches (Leucosticte australis), rock wrens (Salpinctes obsoletus), and pipits are also seen or heard at timberline and near the summit.

Riparian zones
Nutrient-rich ecosystems exist on Rollins Pass where water, and bodies of water, meet the alpine and subalpine tundras.

Lakes
There are three lakes on the west side of Rollins Pass: Deadman's Lake, Pumphouse Lake, and Corona Lake. On the east side of Rollins Pass are King Lake, Yankee Doodle Lake, and Jenny Lake. Historically, Yankee Doodle Lake was referred to as Lake Jennie by John Quincy Adams Rollins, but modern archaeologists have re-interpreted this to be the modern day Yankee Doodle Lake; the railroad and period newspapers occasionally referred to this lake as Dixie Lake. Also in the vicinity: Bob Lake, Betty Lake, the Forest Lakes, Skyscraper Reservoir, Lost Lake, and Woodland Lake.

In 2010, Pumphouse Lake and Ranch Creek were assessed by the Environmental Protection Agency and were determined to be polluted.

Creeks and rivers
On the west side, in addition to the Fraser River at the start of Rollins Pass are the following creeks: the South Fork of Ranch Creek, the Middle Fork of Ranch Creek (fed by Deadman's Lake), and Ranch Creek (fed by Pumphouse and Corona Lakes). On the east side of Rollins Pass, the South Fork of the Middle Boulder Creek is fed by Bob and Betty Lakes and Jenny Creek is fed by both Jenny and Yankee Doodle Lakes; further downstream, Antelope Creek feeds into Jenny Creek. The South Boulder Creek runs at the start of Rollins Pass on the eastern side; but first flows through Buttermilk Falls, a large  waterfall, near King Lake, visible from the summit and upper eastern portions of Rollins Pass.

Improvements
A summer 2006 project led by the United States Forest Service and having the participation of both environmental and user groups saw improvements made to wetlands, lakeshore, and upland habitats at Yankee Doodle Lake and Jenny Creek. Fencing was installed to restrict vehicle travel to designated routes and improve degraded areas. Before work could begin, sectional excavations by archaeologists took place to document the wagon road era settlements of the "Town of Yankee Doodle at Lake Jennie," located at present day Yankee Doodle Lake.

Wildfires
In the summers, wildfire danger increases due to various environmental factors: low moisture, lightning strikes, high winds, and human-caused factors. As the pass is a recreational area, wildfires can also be caused by unmanaged, unattended, and/or uncontrolled campfires.

Fire restrictions
At present, fire restrictions apply to the areas comprising Rollins Pass. Typically, these protective restrictions tend to be enacted starting as early as mid-late July or later in August:

 On Friday, July 10, 2020, the east side of Rollins Pass, located in both Boulder and Gilpin counties, went under Stage 2 Fire Restrictions.
 On Friday, July 10, 2020, the west side of Rollins Pass, located in Grand County, went under Stage 1 Fire Restrictions on USFS lands only.

Nature caused
 On Saturday, August 3, 1996, a lightning strike caused one of the easternmost wooden trestles near the summit to catch fire; the blaze was extinguished by fire crews before the trestle's integrity could be compromised. The wooden trestle was likely saved by the use of coal-tar creosote applied to treat and preserve the wood, as part of the Bethell process.

Human or equipment caused
 On September 27, 1915, Mart Wolf, owner of the Elk Creek Saloon, set fire to his establishment in the town of Arrow on the west side of Rollins Pass in the hopes of collecting insurance money totaling $1,000. Due to high winds, the fire quickly spread and Arrow was all but snuffed out of existence.
 On Wednesday, October 30, 1918, a fire started at or near the boiler house (on the south side of the Corona shed) and fanned by  winds claimed the power station, telegraph system at the summit, along with several miles of track, snowsheds, as well as buildings at Corona, including the destruction of the water tank upon which the Weather Bureau's observation station was mounted. Train service over the pass, after the rails were relaid, resumed on Friday, November 1, 1918; snowshed reconstruction caused delays, yet continued through November and December. A new electric lighting system was installed at the summit the next year (1919). Box cars were used as temporary buildings as the workers' quarters (for watchmen and operators), the depot, telegraph office, eating house (not to be confused with the dining hall), and more were destroyed.
 In 1923, a train caused a wildfire on the east side of Rollins Pass on Giant's Ladder.
 On Wednesday, January 26, 1927, the town of Rollinsville was nearly destroyed by a fire believed to have been started by a spark from a locomotive. Five buildings were destroyed and 20 guests in the Rollinsville hotel lost their personal belongings when the hotel burned to the ground.
 On Friday, August 19, 1938, a manmade fire started and was spread by high winds near the East Portal of the Moffat Tunnel. More than 700 men helped to fight the fire that consumed at least 800 acres near Tolland.
 On Wednesday, August 4, 2010, a plane crash on the east side of the pass caused a small wildfire.

Unknown cause
 On Tuesday, July 30, 2019, a small sub-acre fire ignited behind the Lakota subdivision on the lower portions of Rollins Pass; the fire was extinguished by the following evening.

Climate

Seasons

Winter
Arctic conditions are prevalent during the winter, with sudden blizzards, high winds, and deep snowpack. The subalpine region does not begin to experience spring-like conditions until June. Wildflowers bloom from late June to early August.

Summer
Due to high-elevation above timberline in a backcountry setting, there is neither lightning protection nor lightning mitigation from sudden thunderstorms resulting in a high-risk, extremely dangerous situation for visitors. The most suitable—but not best—refuge available from electrical storms would be in a metal-topped vehicle as it would serve as a mobile Faraday cage.

Weather equipment and historical records

Historical
During the railroad era, a United States Weather Bureau observation station was mounted atop the large water tank at the townsite of Corona. Both these temperatures and wind speeds are in line with today's conditions in Colorado's high mountains.

Present day
A small, solar-powered weather station exists on the west side of Rollins Pass, located above Ptarmigan Point.

Atmospheric pressure
At this pressure, many people, especially out-of-town visitors from lower elevations, can suffer from rapid dehydration and altitude sickness, also known as acute mountain sickness. Acute mountain sickness can progress to high-altitude pulmonary edema (HAPE) or high-altitude cerebral edema (HACE), both of which are potentially fatal.

Historically, newspaper reports wrote of both visitors and railroad workers experiencing heart attacks and pneumonia at the summit of Rollins Pass as well as severe frostbite, including in July.

Avalanches
Human-triggered and natural avalanches are possible anywhere on the pass and there have been four notable avalanches—three at Yankee Doodle Lake—on Rollins Pass:

Railroad era
 On Tuesday, January 27, 1914, sliding snow from Tunnel #32 "completely covered the track for a long distance" caused a multi-day blockage at or near Yankee Doodle Lake.
The engineer of the assisting engine was "scalded about the head so badly that the bones of the face were exposed and he is not expected to live." Other railroad workers died and several were injured.

Post-railroad era
Backcountry skiers, snowshoers, and snowmobilers are advised to check daily avalanche forecasts, practice diligent terrain management, and always carry and know how to use rescue gear, including Emergency Position-Indicating Radio Beacons (EPIRBs).

• On Wednesday, November 28, 2001, two highly-experienced backcountry skiers triggered a sizable hard-slab avalanche in the Yankee Doodle Lake basin. The avalanche pushed both men into the lake and one survivor was sent  into the center of the lake. The survivor, suffering from hypothermia and frostbite, hiked [to]  to the Eldora Mountain Resort where he sought help. The search involved ground crews, air crews, avalanche rescue dogs, and trained dive-rescuers with specialized rubber suits. Both skiers were well-equipped, including having avalanche transceivers. Following the accident, each year in December, the Rocky Mountain Rescue Group holds a Joe Despres Memorial Dry Land Transceiver Training to include practices for using transceivers, along with avalanche courses, fundraising, and backcountry seminars.

• On Sunday, February 14, 2021, a 58-year old male triggered an avalanche on the east-facing slope of Mount Epworth while snowmobiling and perished at Pumphouse Lake.

• On Saturday, January 7, 2023, two snowmobilers triggered a fatal avalanche on the eastern slope of Mount Epworth. One snowmobiler, age 58, was wearing an avalanche beacon—his body was recovered the same day; the other man, age 52, was not wearing an avalanche beacon and the recovery operation was postponed until the following day. The recovery operating involved the Grand County Sheriff's Office, Grand County Search and Rescue, Grand County EMS - Mountain Medical Response Team, Winter Park Ski Patrol Dog Team, Flight For Life Colorado, and the Colorado Avalanche Information Center (CAIC).

Access

General information and seasonal recreation

Rollins Pass is managed by the United States Forest Service as a recreational location and can be accessed from roads on both west and east sides; however, no motorized route connects across the Continental Divide. Current-year Motor Vehicle Use Maps (MVUMs) should be reviewed to determine which trails and roads are open to vehicles. Violators are subject to fines up to $5,000—"regardless of the presence or absence of signs" and operating a vehicle in wilderness areas is prohibited. Buck and rail fences have been placed at select areas on the pass to indicate routes or areas closed to motor vehicles.

There are no facilities, shops, restrooms, call boxes, water fountains, trash receptacles, nor shelters located on either side of the pass. The small hut was constructed  years ago and is open year-round. A series of hand-constructed stone windbreaks exist above timberline north of Needle's Eye Tunnel—these structures date to the railroad era on Rollins Pass and are not prehistoric. These windbreaks currently lack upper coverings or roofs and serve only as aerodynamic dampeners for wind and wind gusts.

Winter
Both sides of the pass can be traveled by snowmobile when at least  of snow cover the road in the winter—generally beginning in late November or early December and lasting through early April.

Spring
Both sides of the pass are closed in spring—including several weeks in June—to any form of motorized traffic: snowmobiles, automobiles, Off-road vehicles (ORVs), All-terrain vehicles (ATVs), or motorcycles for the prevention of road damage.

Summer and early autumn
Both sides of the pass can be traveled—in good weather—by motorized vehicles in the summer and early autumn. Rollins Pass is scheduled open for vehicular summer traffic from June 15 through November 15; however, it is generally not possible given typical snowfall accumulations and slower melt rates in southerly-shaded areas, to drive higher than Sunnyside (site of the old block station) or Ptarmigan Point on the western side, or Yankee Doodle Lake on the eastern side before early-to-mid July. In 2019, and in other summers when the prior season's snowfall has been late and/or considerable, mid-elevation gates on the west side of Rollins Pass remained closed on June 15 due to an order, "Extended closure due to snow, runoff, and road damage 36 CFR 261.54a."

The first high-country snowstorms bring fierce winds and create impassible snow drifts that are not plowed; this effectively puts higher landmarks—including the summit—out of reach as soon as late September or early October. On average, the near-annual existence of snow at or above timberline, ensures the road is only passable less than 90 days per year.

Summer usage of the pass is currently classified as 'heavy' by the United States Forest Service; as such, parking can be very limited at designated parking sites. While the route mostly has gentle grades with switchbacks between two and four percent and does not contain loose gravel, four-wheel drive higher-clearance vehicles fare better than two-wheel drive vehicles, particularly in certain technical sections: some areas on the east side have up to a 17.63% grade; the west side has some areas with a 15% grade. In all narrow sections, the vehicle heading downhill must yield to the vehicle traveling uphill.

From the north or south (along the Continental Divide Trail)
The Continental Divide Trail crosses the summit of Rollins Pass from south to north; the trail bisects the former wye at Corona and takes hikers through the Indian Peaks Wilderness past the dining hall foundation at the summit.

From the east (near Rollinsville & Tolland)

The road up the pass on the eastern side from the Peak to Peak Highway (State Highway 119) begins at the East Portal road running west, parallel to South Boulder Creek and the current Union Pacific Railroad tracks, to the East Portal of the Moffat Tunnel, and then rises on the abandoned railroad grade from Giant's Ladder to the closed Needle's Eye Tunnel. From Rollinsville to East Portal, the road is an all-weather gravel road, with several chattery washboard sections, that can be traveled by regular automobiles. However, beginning at East Portal, at the formal start of Rollins Pass road (Forest Service Road 117), the road prism becomes very rough due to sustained sections of angular cobbles and potholes, the latter being several feet in size. The road has a level 2 road maintenance status described as "assigned to roads open for use by high-clearance vehicles" that includes the following attributes: "surface smoothness is not a consideration" and is "not suitable for passenger cars."

A rough trail continues around either side of the tunnel for non-motorized transportation; the road is open for hiking and mountain biking beyond the barricaded portal of the tunnel toward the summit. No motorized route connects across the Continental Divide.

A majority of the lower portion of the east side of the pass is posted private property with no trespassing off either side of the road as the properties belong to or are part of a conservation easement, Tolland Ranch, LLC and the Zarlengo Family Partnership, LLP as well as smaller land segments belonging to other entities. Shortly before the Spruce Wye, the land ownership transitions back to the Arapaho and Roosevelt National Forest where it remains uninterrupted up to and including the summit and surrounding areas.

From the west (near Winter Park)
The road up the pass (County Road 80) on the western side from Winter Park starts from U.S. Highway 40 in Winter Park and has several sections of angular cobbles and potholes of varying dimensions, some several feet in size. The road has a level 2 road maintenance status described as "assigned to roads open for use by high-clearance vehicles" that includes the following attributes: "surface smoothness is not a consideration" and is "not suitable for passenger cars."

Exactly  before reaching the summit, capable vehicles can turn right onto County Road 80 and continue via Forest Service Road 501.1—this rough road rises above and bypasses the summit for another  before dead-ending overhead Yankee Doodle Lake at Guinn Mountain. No motorized route connects across the Continental Divide.

Shortly after the ghost town of Arrow and several miles before the Ranch Creek Wye, the land ownership transitions back to the Arapaho and Roosevelt National Forest where it remains uninterrupted up to and including the summit and surrounding areas.

Guided tours
 Winter: Guided winter snowmobile tours follow much of the summer road from Arrow and terminate shortly after Sunnyside at Ptarmigan Point (located further uphill and past the Riflesight Notch trestle). Winter tours "top out at nearly 12,000 feet" but do not go higher than Ptarmigan Point and do not reach the summit at 11,676.79 feet.
 Summer: Guided summer off-road (off-pavement) tours are also conducted on the west side of Rollins Pass; however, all tours are conducted on-road using off-road capable vehicles and any off-roading is strictly prohibited.

Incidents and accidents
Due to hairpin turns, steep terrain, and inclement weather, there have been several incidents and accidents, some fatal on or near the Rollins Pass road:

Non-motorized
 On Tuesday, March 19, 1968, a young hiker was rescued near the Riflesight Notch trestle after hiking from East Portal to Winter Park without snowshoes, skis, or adequate clothing.
 On Wednesday, July 18, 2012, a woman was injured after losing her footing and sliding  down a snowfield where she crashed into rocks at the bottom of the slope. The injured woman was taken via a Flight for Life helicopter to Denver.
 On Sunday, February 4, 2018, a backcountry skier fell, sustained multiple injuries—including broken bones, and became unconscious. His friend was able to phone for emergency services but a helicopter could not land due to  winds and blowing snow. Rescuers could not arrive until 10 hours later.
 On Saturday, August 4, 2018, a backcountry skier fell approximately  down Skyscraper Glacier on Rollins Pass, impacted rocks, and became unconscious. Search and rescue services were mobilized and the 23-year-old skier was able to hike back to the summit.
 On Saturday, July 18, 2020, a backcountry hiker fell approximately 300 feet down a scree slope on Rollins Pass, near Needle's Eye Tunnel, sustained serious injuries, and was found to be unconscious and unresponsive. Search and rescue services were mobilized and the 57-year-old hiker was airlifted to Denver.
 On Monday, September 7, 2020, a 17-year-old backcountry skier fell while backcountry skiing on Skyscraper Glacier and smashed into rocks, resulting in a head laceration. Three flights were made over the course of the seven hour rescue and the rescue involved the following agencies: Boulder County Sheriff's Office, American Medical Response, Nederland Fire Department, Timberline Fire Department, Rocky Mountain Rescue Group, Grand County Search and Rescue, Flight For Life Colorado, Colorado Army National Guard, and the Colorado Search and Rescue Association.
 On Sunday, February 21, 2021, a 47-year-old woman became lost while snowshoeing on Jenny Creek Trail towards Yankee Doodle Lake. Fifteen different search and rescue agencies were involved with her rescue, including: Boulder County Sheriff's Office, Rocky Mountain Rescue Group, Front Range Rescue Dogs, Boulder Emergency Squad, Eldora Ski Patrol, City of Boulder Water Utilities Department, U.S. Air Force Rescue Coordination Center, American Medical Response, Colorado Search and Rescue, Nederland Fire Protection District, Northern Colorado Med Evac, Flight for Life Colorado, Colorado Division of Fire Prevention and Control, Regional Transportation District and Alpine Rescue Team.

Motorized
 In the winter of 2001–2002, a search and rescue effort to extricate men with 'severe hypothermia' ended with a snowmobile wreck near Corona Lake. The wreck resulted in one man's thigh becoming broken in six places.
 On Saturday, August 23, 2003, a car illegally off-roaded on the Riflesight Notch Loop and required towing. The driver was fined $500.
 On Saturday, October 8, 2011, a car crashed into the South Boulder Creek off of Rollins Pass road, the driver was pronounced dead at the scene and the passenger was taken to the hospital.
 On Monday, February 18, 2013, a snowmobiler on the west side of Rollins Pass, lost control of his machine on a groomed trail and struck a tree where he was pronounced dead by search and rescue services.
 On Sunday, August 16, 2015, two girls—ages 11 and 12—were driving ATVs underage, went over a  cliff on Rollins Pass road; requiring the services of both an ambulance and a medical evacuation by helicopter.
 On Saturday, May 5, 2018, search and rescue services were called for an ATV rollover accident on the east side of Rollins Pass.
 On Saturday, August 17, 2019, sheriffs responded to a motorcycle crash on the east side of Rollins Pass; the driver was transported to the hospital.
 There are several motor vehicles that have wrecked on Rollins Pass; yet these instances appear to have been done deliberately as no news articles seem to be associated with these wrecks. Four wrecks are still visible on the east side of Rollins Pass—one car and one snowmobile on the first leg of Giant's Ladder near the start of the Rollins Pass road; one car near Guinn Mountain closer to the summit; and one ATV directly off the summit, downslope from the old pergola, on the eastern side of the Continental Divide (recovered in mid-September 2018). On the west side of the pass, a wrecked snowmobile can still be found at the southern slopes of Mount Epworth near the shores of Deadman's Lake.

Routes, trails, and closures
The complete pass is open and accessible for snowshoeing, fatbiking, backcountry skiing, and cross-country skiing in the winter and to hikers, bicyclists (including those on tandems and unicyclists), and horseback riders in the summer. For the past  years—since July 1990—no motorized route connects across the Continental Divide, effectively making each side a dead-end uphill route that must be traveled again, downhill, to leave the pass.

Historic wagon route
For visitors in or on motor vehicles wishing to access and retrace the historic wagon route over the pass (from east to west), there are numerous closures, some permanent, and no motorized route connects over the Continental Divide at Rollins Pass:

 Near Rollinsville, the Jenny Creek motorized trail follows the historic wagon road on National Forest System Road (NFSR) Route Number 502.1 that connects with NFSR 808.1 terminating near Yankee Doodle Lake.
 The wagon road becomes NFSR 501 at Yankee Doodle Lake and while this route can be hiked, it has a permanent closure for motorized vehicles of any type and several switchbacks on the steeper parts of this route are within the Indian Peaks Wilderness boundaries. This area is monitored for violations.
 NFSR 501 connects above Guinn Mountain and becomes NFSR 501.1, which is long and connects to NFSR 149, near the summit of Rollins Pass.
 Near this point, the historic wagon route can only be followed on foot into Middle Park.

Railroad line
For visitors in or on motor vehicles wishing to access and retrace the old railroad line, the majority of the railroad route or right-of-way over the pass is open and intact with several exceptions, detailed below, and no motorized route connects over the Continental Divide at Rollins Pass:

 Some of the railroad trestles have deteriorated (at Riflesight Notch), have been destroyed (trestle #72.83 on the west side, by the FAA [then the Civil Aeronautics Administration (CAA)] in 1953), or have been dismantled (trestles #51.00 and #54.48 on the east side). Per the current Motor Vehicle Use Maps, all extant trestles on the pass are closed to any form of motorized traffic, including motorcycles. 
 Two railroad tunnels on Rollins Pass are completely caved-in: Tunnel #31 (the tunnel at Ladora) and Tunnel #33 (the Loop Tunnel at Riflesight Notch). 
Surveyors looking to establish the automobile route over the pass in 1949 found, and cleared, considerable rockfalls at the northeast portal of the tunnel. The tunnel was open to automobiles, as part of the thoroughfare over the pass, from 1956–1979 for seasonal and inessential purposes. In 1979, the tunnel was closed due to rock falls at the northeast portal; following a geologic engineering study in 1981, a Mine Safety and Health Administration study in 1985, engineering design work in 1986, and repair work in August 1987, the tunnel was re-opened in 1989. The following year, in July 1990, several thousand pounds of rock fell from the crown of the tunnel, injuring a United States Navy veteran and Denver firefighter resulting in a below-knee amputation. Since then, the tunnel was sealed by Boulder County officials along with the United States Forest Service and sizable rockfalls continue to occur at the northeast portal, southwest portal, and center of the tunnel from both the crown and shoulder of the structure. In November 1990, the post-accident engineering report, by independent geotechnical consultant Ronald E. Heuer, PhD, cited restoration errors and faulty work: design specifications were not consistently followed, rock bolts were incorrectly spaced, and gravity along with seasonal temperature variations were also listed as factors in the accident.

Adopted trails
Several trails on Rollins Pass are adopted.

 East: NFSR 502 & NFSR 808 (Jenny Creek Trail and spurs), Rising Sun 4 Wheel Drive Club of Colorado
 West: N76 (Riflesight Notch Trail), authors of Rollins Pass

Administrative provision
In 2002, the James Peak Wilderness and Protection Area Act (Public Law 107-216) was passed by Congress and signed into law by President George W. Bush. The act amended the Colorado Wilderness Act of 1993 and designated lands within both the Arapaho National Forest and the Roosevelt National Forest as the James Peak Wilderness area and added lands to the Indian Peaks Wilderness, establishing these lands as federally protected territory. The act contained an administrative provision:

If requested by one or more of the Colorado Counties of Grand, Gilpin, and Boulder, the Secretary shall provide technical assistance and otherwise cooperate with respect to repairing the Rollins Pass road in those counties sufficiently to allow two-wheel-drive vehicles to travel between Colorado State Highway 119 and U.S. Highway 40. If this road is repaired to such extent, the Secretary shall close the motorized roads and trails on Forest Service land indicated on the map entitled 'Rollins Pass Road Reopening: Attendant Road and Trail Closures', dated September 2001.

Historically, both Gilpin and Grand counties have requested to re-open the road; however, Gilpin County has publicly withdrawn their support and opposes re-opening the thoroughfare over the pass, along with Boulder County.

To date, only minor repairs (mostly washout repairs) have been made. The difficulties and expenses of making improvements to the road, including coordination of maintenance and re-introduced liabilities—coupled with intractable disputes surrounding the 1990 accident in the tunnel, have become contentious and ongoing issues; however, alternative routes utilizing the Moffat Tunnel have been proposed.

Land exchange
A proposed land exchange in 2020-2021 between the US Forest Service and a private developer was halted by historic preservation professionals and advocacy groups. The proposal would have seen the "literal entrance to the western portion of Rollins Pass [...] become an entrance to a private development." The developer sought to trade between 1,536 and 2,261 acres of land for 543 acres held by the US Forest Service. Rollins Pass holds resources in a National Historic District spanning Grand, Boulder, and Gilpin counties and this land exchange would have damaged the historic district as well. Unfortunately, this project had initial support from local leadership and economic influencers—including multimillion dollar resorts—yet none of their letters of support mentioned Rollins Pass nor its cultural and non-renewable historic resources. Instead, community leaders mirrored the developer in writing to the US Forest Service that the 543 acres "are squarely in the development path and are a logical place for future growth to occur." This land exchange was discussed in a 2022 book on Rollins Pass:

In recent years, the historic integrity of Rollins Pass has come under new threat from unsympathetic developers longing to build atop soils rich with history that hold panoramic views. Of late, one attempt at a land exchange with the US Forest Service would have transformed the entrance of the western portion of Rollins Pass into an opening, quite literally, for a private development. Advocates rallied on behalf of public lands, and for now, the area remains in public hands. Embarrassingly, continued pro-development aspirations and the failure to see beyond real estate values only reinforces the area's inclusion as one of Colorado's Most Endangered Places.

Airspace and aviation

Airspace
The entirety of Rollins Pass currently resides in Class G airspace. Per the FAA Pilot's Handbook of Aeronautical Knowledge, "Although ATC has no authority or responsibility to control air traffic, pilots should remember there are visual flight rules (VFR) minimums that apply to Class G airspace."

Airway Victor Eight
Rollins Pass is traversed by a low altitude enroute airway radial, Victor Eight, the width of the airway is 4 nautical miles on either side of the centerline which skirts the summit of the pass. Pilots have recommended to avoid the area in bad weather due to extreme downdrafts, mountain waves, and turbulence on the east side of the pass.

Drone operations
Drone (UAS) flights are permissible in Class G airspace on/over Rollins Pass provided all flights adhere to the FAA's regulations for recreational or commercial drone flights. The one major restriction is that drones cannot take off from, land in, or be operated from congressionally designated wilderness areas. Remote pilots and drone enthusiasts should exercise extreme caution as the enroute airway radial brings fast-moving aircraft within the area, including Flight for Life helicopters, aerial firefighting aircraft, search and rescue helicopters, and high-speed military aircraft; many of which fly below 500 AGL.

Emergency landing zone
A non-illuminated summer emergency backcountry helicopter landing zone exists at the summit, placed sometime between September 1999 and October 2005.

Rotating airway light beacon (Beacon 82)
The glass-domed lighted beacon rotated six times per minute, marking the airway between Los Angeles and Denver, and it held a two-million candlepower electric lamp with a  parabolic reflector. The beacon was removed in the late-1960s and is currently in storage (not on display) at the Pioneer Village Museum in Hot Sulphur Springs, Colorado; however an  concrete foundation remains near the top of the peak along with the leg stubs used for the beacon's lattice tower.

Accidents and incidents
There have been many documented airplane and helicopter crashes on and near Rollins Pass:

 On Sunday, August 21, 1949, two people were killed instantly when their plane crashed on Rollins Pass.
 On Wednesday, January 6, 1954, a single engine airplane—a Beechcraft C35—with a tail number of N792D, crashed on a shoulder of Guinn Mountain near Yankee Doodle Lake on the east side of Rollins Pass.
 On Saturday, March 3, 1962, a Beechcraft 35 with a tail number of N430B, crashed near Rollins Pass close to Jenny Creek.
 On Tuesday, March 6, 1962, a Bell UH-1 Iroquois military helicopter with a tail number of AF91635, crashed near Rollins Pass close to Jenny Creek.
 On Friday, January 24, 1964, a single engine airplane, with a tail number of N4351N, crashed in turbulent, cloudy, and stormy conditions near the Riflesight Notch Loop on Rollins Pass. One pilot and three passengers of the Cessna 195 were killed on impact and recovery did not occur until August 20 that year.
 On Monday, July 11, 1966, a nonscheduled operation of an Alamo Airways De Havilland 104-6A, with a tail number of N1563V, impacted a mountainside in turbulent, cloudy, and stormy conditions on Rollins Pass. The crash of this dual engine plane occurred upslope of Deadman's Lake, opposite Mount Epworth at the crest of the Continental Divide. Upon impact, the plane did not catch fire, presumably due to low fuel reserves, and was completely disintegrated; recovery efforts salvaged all debris except for the front landing gear as it could not be located. To date, the nose wheel still has not yet been located. Two crew and one passenger were killed.
 On Saturday, January 3, 1970, a Cessna 172 with a tail number of N7104A, crashed into an alpine lake at "11,700  feet" near Rollins Pass, killing both aboard.
 On Tuesday, December 14, 1971, a single engine AT6 trainer crashed near Rollins Pass, killing the pilot.
 On Saturday, September 14, 1974, a pilot and his passenger crashed near Rollins Pass.
 On Wednesday, December 30, 1998, a single engine airplane—a Piper PA-28 Cherokee—made an unplanned forced landing on the east side of Rollins Pass in the midst of extreme wind and low visibility conditions. A cross-country skier was able to phone for a rescue, conducted by snowmobile, of the two passengers and one pilot who were injured; yet all three survived and were released from the hospital that evening.
 On Sunday, July 30, 2006, a single engine airplane, with a tail number of N5232X, crashed in clear conditions on Rollins Pass, approximately equidistant from Bob, Betty, and King Lakes. The two occupants of the 1969 American Champion 7KCAB were killed on impact.
 On Wednesday, August 4, 2010, a single engine airplane, with a tail number of N8974A, crashed in clear conditions on Rollins Pass, near Jenny Creek, southeast of Yankee Doodle Lake. All three occupants of the 1951 Beechcraft C35 airplane were killed on impact.

In popular culture

Film, music, and books
 Country music artist, Tracy Byrd, recorded a music video for the 1996 single, Big Love, which featured sights on the west side of Rollins Pass, including: Ptarmigan Point, Mount Epworth, Deadman's Lake, Riflesight Notch trestle, and more. The album cover pictures the artist himself in front of a scenic backdrop that can be seen at the summit of Rollins Pass, looking northeast; the back of the album features the artist holding his guitar while seated on a rock outcropping near the railroad-era dining hall foundation at the summit.
 The Metro-Goldwyn-Mayer 1925 silent film, The White Desert, starring Claire Windsor as Robinette McFarlane and Pat O'Malley as Barry Houston was filmed on Rollins Pass in the winter of 1922 and released to the public on Monday, May 4, 1925. The film features moving pictures of long trains ascending Riflesight Notch trestle and of rotary snowplows in action between Ptarmigan Point and the summit. The railroad imagery is displayed only at both the beginning and the end of the movie with dramatic scenes (mostly indoor or pseudo-outdoor) and both dialogue intertitles and expository intertitles filling most of the film's runtime. The film is considered to be rare and has historical significance due to the footage of trains and rotaries operating on Rollins Pass.
 The 1928 Metro-Goldwyn-Mayer silent drama film, The Trail of '98, was filmed in part on Rollins Pass as well as inside the Moffat Tunnel using specialized lighting. The film was directed by Clarence Brown and starred Harry Carey as Jack Locasto.
 In the late 1920s, movie producers scouted Rollins Pass as a possible location for a third motion picture.
 On Saturday, November 3, 2012, Colorado State University archaeology professor Dr. Jason M. LaBelle and colleague Dr. Pete Seel debuted their documentary film, Stone and Steel at the Top of the World which describes the ancient hunters of the Colorado high country as well as the Moffat Road railway. As part of a Rollins Pass Mini-Film Fest event held at Colorado State University, the documentary was shown prior to a rare screening of The White Desert in Fort Collins, Colorado. This occasion marked the first time Reginald Barker's silent film had been shown since 1978.
 On Saturday, May 12, 2018, Colorado State University archaeology professor Dr. Jason M. LaBelle along with the authors of multiple archaeological and research-based publications on Rollins Pass, B. Travis Wright, MPS and Kate Wright, MBA, held a book launch event and presentation for Rollins Pass titled, Rollins Pass: Through the Lens of Time that included an encore screening of Dr. LaBelle's documentary film, Stone and Steel at the Top of the World as well as a rare screening of The White Desert at the Alamo Drafthouse Cinema in Littleton, Colorado. At the event, as a central part of the authors' founding movement Preserve Rollins Pass, the authors discussed the importance of leaving artifacts in place and their efforts to build a database of the GPS locations of prehistoric and historic artifacts that is made available for the benefit of archaeologists and land managers. They also revealed The John Trezise Archive for Rollins Pass Imagery—the "world's largest collection of Rollins Pass imagery for non-commercial use that is crowd-sourced, completely searchable and available to the public through partnerships with requesting museums/libraries, and secured from loss."
 The 2018 Peak to Peak Chorale's spring musical told "the tale of a train trapped for days by a spring blizzard atop Rollins Pass in the 1900s." The singers, musicians, and actors portrayed the passengers and crew that departed from The Stage Stop (in Rollinsville, Colorado) and became stranded when a huge rotary snowplow stopped working.

Places and landmarks
 Some ski runs (and one chairlift) at the nearby Winter Park Resort are named after Rollins Pass itself (Rollins Ridge, Corona Way), features on Rollins Pass (Riflesight Notch, Rainbow Cut, Needle's Eye, Phantom Bridge, Sunnyside, Lower Arrowhead Loop, Upper Arrowhead Loop), or are inspired by general railroad terminology (Runaway, Trestle, Sleeper, Boiler, Coupler, Railbender, Derailer, Re-Railer, Whistlestop, Hook Up, Sidetrack, Gandy Dancer, Iron Horse, Black Coal, Switchyard, Golden Spike, Brakeman, Vista Dome, Roundhouse, Narrow Gauge, Zephyr).
 Winter Park Resort's summer downhill mountain bike park is called Trestle.
 Some of Winter Park Resort's buildings and services infrastructure are named after features on Rollins Pass (Mount Epworth), the neighboring Moffat Tunnel (West Portal), and general railroad terminology (Zephyr).
 Two ski runs at the nearby Eldora Ski Resort are named after Rollins Pass: Corona and Corona Road along with the Corona Lift chairlift.
 A real estate development in downtown Winter Park, next to Volarios, has been named after the town of Arrow on Rollins Pass.

Recreation
 For the past  years—since July 1966, the Epworth Cup has been one of the nation's longest-running downhill skiing races held annually in early-to-mid July (usually the Sunday following Independence Day) on Mount Epworth.
 On Thursday, May 10, 2018, it was announced that the Indian Peaks Traverse, a single-track trail of at least  open only to "hikers, bi[cyclists], horseback riders and any other form of non-motorized transport" will traverse a portion of Rollins Pass and was slated for a soft-opening in 2022.
 In June 2019, a digital magazine's photo shoot featuring summer mountain gear occurred at (and near) the historic cabins at East Portal.
 On Thursday, January 30, 2020, the five remaining East Portal Camp Cabins (located at the East Portal of the Moffat Tunnel adjacent to Rollins Pass) were classified by Colorado Preservation, Inc. as one of Colorado's Most Endangered Places.
 Equipment outfitters use Rollins Pass as a testing ground for gear.

Equipment
 The Denver & Salt Lake Railway Derrick No. 10300 that helped clear wrecks more than a century ago on Rollins Pass is now housed in Granby, Colorado at the Moffat Road Railroad Museum.

Science and archaeology
 In July 2016, the United States Forest Service held a Passport in Time project on Rollins Pass where volunteers joined "Heritage Program staff from the Arapaho and Roosevelt National Forests/Pawnee National Grassland (ARP) for an archaeological survey along the known trajectory of Moffat [R]oad."

See also

Colorado mountain passes
National Register of Historic Places listings in Boulder County, Colorado
National Register of Historic Places listings in Gilpin County, Colorado
National Register of Historic Places listings in Grand County, Colorado

Notes
†.No passenger lives were lost during the years Rollins Pass served as a railroad; the Passenger deaths column reflects this fact with a value of N/A for each row.
‡.For archaeology projects where federal laws apply, patterned cultural activity or features older than 50 years are considered historic.
††. Otto Perry's Moffat Route DVD, released on July 13, 2006, contains select motion picture rotary footage from The White Desert.

References

Further reading
 Black III, Robert C. (1969). Island in the Rockies. Grand County Pioneer Society. .
 Bollinger, Rev. Edward T. (1979). Rails That Climb. Boulder, Colorado: Johnson Publishing Company. .
 Bollinger, Rev. Edward T. & Bauer, Frederick. (1981). The Moffat Road. Athens, Ohio: Ohio University Press. .
 Bowles, Samuel. (1869). The Switzerland of America: A Summer Vacation in the Parks and Mountains of Colorado. Norman, Oklahoma: University of Oklahoma Press.  .
 Boner, Harold A. (1962). The Giant's Ladder. Milwaukee, Wisconsin: Kalmbach. .
 Church, Minette C. et al. (2007). Colorado History: A Context for Historical Archaeology. Denver, Colorado: Colorado Council of Professional Archaeologists. .
 Crossen, Forest. (1976). Western Yesterdays: David Moffat's Hill Men. Fort Collins, Colorado: Robinson Press, Inc. .
 Griswold, P.R. "Bob." (1995). David Moffat's Denver, Northwestern and Pacific. Denver, Colorado: Rocky Mountain Railroad Club. .
 Griswold, P.R. "Bob." (2010). The Moffat Road 2-26-28. Aurora, Colorado: Double R Publishing.
 Hitchcock, F.C., and C.C. Tinkler. (1927). The Contractors' Story of the Moffat Tunnel: Not an Engineering Treatise. Denver, Colorado: Hitchcock & Tinkler.
 LaBelle, Jason M. & Pelton, Spencer R. (2013). Communal hunting along the Continental Divide of Northern Colorado: Results from the Olson game drive (5BL147). Quaternary International: Volume 297, May 29, 2013, Pages 45–63.
 Miller, Wick R. (1986). Numic Languages in Handbook of North American Indians, Volume 11: Great Basin. Washington, D.C.: Smithsonian Institution. .
 Sells, John A. (2011). The Moffat Line: David Moffat's Railroad Over And Under The Continental Divide. Bloomington, Indiana: iUniverse Publishing. .
 Sprague, Marshall. (1964). The Great Gates: The Story of the Rocky Mountain Passes. Boston, Massachusetts: Little, Brown and Company. .
 Sundquist, Elizabeth Josephson. (1994). Dismantling the Rails that Climbed. Denver, Colorado: Egan Printing Company.
 Wright, B. Travis & Wright, Kate. Foreword by Jason M. LaBelle, PhD. (2018). Rollins Pass. Charleston, South Carolina: Arcadia Publishing. .
 Wright, B. Travis & Wright, Kate. Foreword by Jason M. LaBelle, PhD. (2018). Rollins Pass. Charleston, South Carolina: Arcadia Publishing. .
 Wright, B. Travis & Wright, Kate. (2018). Rollins Pass. Charleston, South Carolina: Arcadia Publishing. .
 Wright, B. Travis & Wright, Kate. (2022). Rollins Pass: Past & Present. Charleston, South Carolina: Arcadia Publishing. .

External links

 Google Maps view of the Rollins Pass summit
 Artist renderings of the rail line over Rollins Pass

Rail mountain passes of the United States
Mountain passes of Colorado
Landforms of Boulder County, Colorado
Landforms of Gilpin County, Colorado
Landforms of Grand County, Colorado
Denver and Rio Grande Western Railroad
Tourist attractions in Boulder County, Colorado
Tourist attractions in Grand County, Colorado
Historic districts on the National Register of Historic Places in Colorado